Roberto Batres Díaz (born 8 January 1986) is a Spanish retired footballer who played as an attacking midfielder.

Club career
Born in Madrid, Batres joined Atlético Madrid's youth ranks at the age of 10. After one season with the C-team in the Tercera División, he went on to represent the reserves for the following six years in the Segunda División B, scoring nine goals in only 15 games in 2007–08.

In July 2009, Batres was loaned to Albacete Balompié on a six-month deal, but failed to make an impact at the Segunda División side, playing just 16 minutes in a 0–0 home draw against Real Sociedad. The following January, he joined Chinese club Shanghai Shenhua F.C. on loan until the end of the campaign; however, he suffered another serious knee injury and returned to Madrid for surgery and rehabilitation.

In early December 2010, Batres returned to action for Atlético B. In late August 2011 he left the Vicente Calderón Stadium and signed for CD Alcoyano, recently promoted to the second level.

After only playing 289 minutes in the first half of 2011–12, Batres was fired in late December for comments made on Facebook in which he implied he would not return to the team if he won the lottery. He then moved to the Netherlands, signing with AGOVV Apeldoorn on 31 January 2012; he failed to make a single appearance for his new club and returned home, going on to represent CD Leganés and SD Huesca of the third tier before retiring at the age of 28.

References

External links

1986 births
Living people
Footballers from Madrid
Spanish footballers
Association football midfielders
Segunda División players
Segunda División B players
Tercera División players
Atlético Madrid C players
Atlético Madrid B players
Albacete Balompié players
CD Alcoyano footballers
CD Leganés players
SD Huesca footballers
Shanghai Shenhua F.C. players
AGOVV Apeldoorn players
Spain youth international footballers
Spanish expatriate footballers
Expatriate footballers in China
Expatriate footballers in the Netherlands
Spanish expatriate sportspeople in China
Spanish expatriate sportspeople in the Netherlands